Ivan Ćosić may refer to:

 Ivan Ćosić (footballer) (born 1989), Croatian-German footballer
 Ivan Ćosić (volleyball) (born 1984), Croatian volleyball player
 Ivan Ćosić (handballer) (born 1986), Croatian handball player